Founded in 2014, 8i is a volumetric video company specializing in the capture, transformation, and streaming of real human holograms, on any device, for the Metaverse.

History 
8i was founded in May 2014 by Linc Gasking, Eugene d'Eon, Sebastian Marino and Joshua Feast to develop software that can capture, analyze, compress, and recreate all the viewpoints required for volumetric capture.

In October 2015, 8i raised a $13.5 million Series A. Investors included RRE Ventures, Founders Fund Science, Samsung Ventures, and Dolby Family Ventures.

In January 2016, 8i premiered #100humans at the 2016 Sundance Film Festival as part of its New Frontier exhibit. The program featured four VR projects that placed characters captured using 8i technology in distinct environments ranging from a dystopian wasteland to the Grand Canyon.

In October of  2018, Hayes Mackaman became CEO and relaunched the company in 2019. Since then he’s focused on productizing core volumetric video technology.

References

External links
 

Virtual reality companies
Technology companies established in 2014
Software companies of New Zealand
Companies based in Los Angeles